More Only is the fourth extended play (EP) by American singer Beyoncé, released on November 24, 2014, by Parkwood Entertainment and Columbia Records. The EP is included on the reissue of her fifth studio album Beyoncé (2013), titled Beyoncé: Platinum Edition, with two newly recorded songs and four previously-released remixes, and a second DVD with ten live performances filmed during The Mrs. Carter Show World Tour (2013–14).

The release was promoted with the release of "Flawless (Remix)" in the United States as the lead single from the EP on August 12, 2014, followed by "7/11" on November 25, 2014.

Content 
Of the six tracks included on More Only, four are remixes of the previously released songs, and two are newly recorded songs. "7/11", which is an uptempo hip hop piece, features Auto-Tune in its composition. The track incorporates several rapping verses by Beyoncé. Caitlin White from MTV News likened the song's production to that of Beyoncé's "Bow Down / I Been On", which was released in March 2013. Lyrically, "7/11" is about Beyoncé's detailing her dance moves: "I put up my hands up, spinning while my hands up / [...] Legs move it side to side, smack in the air." "Ring Off" is described as a midtempo reggae ballad that features dancehall rhythms with slight elements of dubstep. The track, in which she sings: "Mama, I understand your many sleepless nights / When you think about father / and how you tried to be the perfect wife... I wish you didn't hurt at all," addresses the end of a marriage between Beyoncé's parents, Tina and Mathew Knowles. "Standing on the Sun" is an uptempo reggae-inflected song with an island/Caribbean flavor to it.

The extended play version of "Drunk in Love" features a guest appearance from Kanye West, who provided vocals for the official remix; the song features an explicit verse by himself and a slightly modified instrumental produced by Mike Dean. In his lines, West rapped about his wife Kim Kardashian and referenced the video for his own song, "Bound 2" (2013). Musically, the remix to "Flawless" was noted for being a slower version of the original and containing new, sexually explicit verses. It also contains a sample from the horns of Outkast's song "Spottieottiedopaliscious". 
Nicki Minaj provides a rapid-fire delivery using a low timbre. Her lyrics reference the work of Kanye West on the song "Monster", her own success and compares her detractors with Michael Jackson's convicted doctor through numerous punch lines.

Commercial performance 
The EP debuted at number 8 on the Billboard 200. The EP sold 43,000 albums in its first week, but also garnered an additional 28,000 in album equivalent units.

Track listing
Credits adapted from the liner notes of More.

Notes
  signifies a co-producer
  signifies an additional producer
  signifies a vocal producer
Sampling credits
 "Drunk in Love Remix" contains samples of Kanye West's "Flashing Lights", vocals provided by Connie Mitchell.
 "Flawless Remix" contains a sample of "SpottieOttieDopaliscious" by OutKast.
 "Ring Off" contains portions of a speech delivered by Tina Knowles at the 2014 Texas Women's Empowerment Foundation Leadership Luncheon.

Charts

Weekly charts

Year-end charts

Release history

References

2014 compilation albums
Albums produced by Hit-Boy
Albums produced by Jerome "J-Roc" Harmon
Albums produced by Justin Timberlake
Albums produced by Key Wane
Albums produced by Noah "40" Shebib
Albums produced by Detail (record producer)
Albums produced by Pharrell Williams
Albums produced by Ryan Tedder
Albums produced by Timbaland
Beyoncé albums
Columbia Records compilation albums
Reissue albums
Albums produced by Beyoncé